Within the French nobility, the title of "Princess of Soubise" was given to the current wife of the Prince of Soubise. The title was created in 1667 when the sirerie of Soubise, Charente-Maritime was raised to a principality. The first princess was Anne de Rohan-Chabot (1638-1709). There were eight princesses in all, ending with Princess Viktoria of Hesse-Rheinfels-Rotenburg (1728-1792), who was married to the last prince, Charles (1715-1787), the title being extinguished upon Charles' death.

See also
Prince of Soubise

References and notes

Princesses of Soubise
House of Rohan
French princesses
Lists of princesses